Aarhus Gymnastikforening (commonly known as AGF ), is a professional sports club based in Aarhus, Jutland, Denmark. Founded in 1880, it is one of the oldest clubs in the country and gymnastics and fencing are featured as its main sports. However, AGF is mostly known for its football department, which was established in 1902. Currently, the club's first team plays in the Danish Superliga, the top flight of the Danish football league system.

AGF has won five Danish Football Championships and a record nine Danish Cups. In 1961, AGF reached the quarter-finals of the European Cup where they were knocked out by later winners, Benfica. In 1989, AGF again reached a European quarter-final. This time in the European Cup Winners' Cup, where they lost 1–0 on aggregate to later winners FC Barcelona.

History 
AGF played its first football match against Aarhus Idrætsklub Olympia in November 1902, a 5–2 loss. Six years later, the club won the Jutland Football Championship by winning 3–2 over Ringkøbing IF in the final. AGF won the Jutland Football Championship seven times and was in three finals of the Danish Football Championship before AGF became a member of the newly founded Denmark Tournament in 1927.

In 1911, AGF got its own clubhouse after which the club bought the pitches at Dalgas Avenue. In 1920, AGF began to play its home matches at the newly built Aarhus Stadium, where the club has played ever since. In 1941, the club moved from the clubhouse at Dalgas Avenue to Fredensvang in the suburb of Viby J.
For three seasons in a row from 1949 to 1951 AGF finished in third place in the top division. After spending the 1952–53 season in the 2nd Division, AGF returned strongly to the 1st Division and in the next 12 seasons won four Danish Football Championships and five Danish Cups. AGF also participated in the first edition of the European Cup, where they lost 4–2 on aggregate to French club Reims with three goals scored by Léon Glovacki. In 1961, AGF reached the quarter-final in the same tournament where they lost to eventual tournament winners Benfica. AGF were relegated to the 2nd Division in 1968 and in 1973 but returned to the 1st Division in 1976. This was the start of 30 continuous years in the top division.

The introduction of professional football in Denmark had a major influence on the success AGF experienced from the late 1970s and forward until 1998. With former Real Madrid star Henning Jensen on the team, AGF were close at winning the Danish Football Championship in 1982. AGF drew 2–2 against B.93 in the last game of the season which sent the championship to OB. In 1984, AGF were again close to clinching the championship but lost by a single point to the rivals from Vejle Boldklub. Finally in 1986, AGF won their fifth Danish Football Championship. Flemming Povlsen, Jan Bartram and John Stampe were the key players of the team these years. In 1987, 1988 and 1992 AGF also won the Danish Cup.

In 1996, with players such as Stig Tøfting and Håvard Flo, AGF were again close to winning the Danish Football Championship, but lost the title to Brøndby IF in dramatic fashion on the second to last matchday when opposing goalkeeper Mogens Krogh headed in the 3–3 equaliser. AGF would, however, win the Danish Cup that season by beating Brøndby.

In 1998, AGF finished third in the Danish Superliga but financial problems resulted in poor results the following years. In 2000, Peter Rudbæk was fired after seven years as manager. From 2000 onwards, the club experienced some of its worst ever results, which led to relegations in the 2005–06, 2009–10 and 2013–14 seasons. Each time, however, the club secured a quick return to the top-flight.

In the summer of 2014, AGF appointed Jacob Nielsen as their new director. Nielsen had been successful as director of Randers where he had managed to secure good economic results. AGF also hired a new sporting director and Morten Wieghorst as manager. On 6 December 2015, however, Nielsen announced that Wieghorst was fired and that former Danish champion Glen Riddersholm was hired as his replacement.

With Riddersholm as manager AGF finished the 2015–16 season in tenth place having won three games, drawn seven, and lost five in the remainder of the season. AGF qualified for 2016 cup final, in which they lost 2–1 to FC Copenhagen. In the 2016–17 season, AGF finished 11th after having played relegation play-off matches in the new league structure introduced that season.

On 30 September 2017, Riddersholm was fired due to inconsistent results. At that point AGF was seventh in the league having started the 2017–18 season with four wins, five defeats, and two draws. Riddersholm's last match was a 5–1 win against FC Helsingør. New manager was David Nielsen who started with four consecutive league defeats but finished the season in seventh place after losing a European play-off final against FC Copenhagen 4–1. After reaching eighth place in 2018–19 season, the club managed to win the bronze medal in the 2019–20 season.

Stadium
Their home ground is Aarhus Stadium, renamed Ceres Park for sponsorship reasons since 2015, which has a capacity of 19,433.

Honours

National honours 
 Danish Football Championship
 Winners (5): 1954–55, 1955–56, 1956–57, 1960, 1986
 Runners-up (8): 1920–21, 1922–23, 1924–25, 1944–45, 1964, 1982, 1984, 1995–96
 Bronze (12): 1932–33, 1948–49, 1949–50, 1950–51, 1962, 1978, 1983, 1985, 1987, 1991, 1996–97, 2019–20
 Danish Cup
 Winners (9) (record): 1954–55, 1956–57, 1959–60, 1960–61, 1964–65, 1986–87, 1987–88, 1991–92, 1995–96
 Runners-up (3): 1958–59, 1989–90, 2015–16
Sources:

International honours 
 European Cup/UEFA Champions League
 Quarter-finalists (1): 1960–61
 European Cup Winners' Cup
 Quarter-finalists (1): 1988–89
 The Atlantic Cup
 Winners (2): 2018, 2020

Players

Current squad
As of 15 February 2023

Youth players in use 2022-23

Out on loan

Retired numbers 

12 –  AGF Fanclub Aarhus

Former players 
 Leon Andreasen
 Tom Bonde
 Henning Enoksen silver at 1960 Summer Olympics
 Håvard Flo
 Per Frimann
 Henry From silver at 1960 Summer Olympics
 Peter Graulund
 Aage Rou Jensen
 Henning Jensen formerly Real Madrid
 Mads Jørgensen
 Martin Jørgensen
 Bjørn Kristensen
 Søren Larsen
 Aksel Nielsen
 Hans Christian Nielsen silver at 1960 Summer Olympics
 Kent Nielsen winner UEFA Euro 1992
 Brian Steen Nielsen
 Torben Piechnik
 Jakob Poulsen
 Flemming Povlsen
 Troels Rasmussen
 Marc Rieper
 Casper Sloth
 Stig Tøfting
 John Sivebæk
 Claus Thomsen
 Thomas Thorninger
 Jack Wilshere

Coaches 

 A. G. Pettersson (1919–22)
 Mr. Brown (1922–24)
  Harald Hansen (1925–27)
  Alfred Rasmussen (1927–31)
  Fritz Molnar (1932–35)
  William von Würden (1936–37)
  Søren Jensen (1938–39)
  Knud Aage Andersen (1939–40)
  Gerhard Müller (1941–51)
  Peter Vesterbak (1952–54)
  Géza Toldi (1954–56)
  Peter Vesterbak (1956–58)
  Walther Pfeiffer (1959–60)
  Géza Toldi (1960–64)
  Henry From (1965–66)
  Erik Kuld Jensen (1967–68)
  Kaj Christensen (1969–73)
  Jimmy Strain (Denmark) (1974)
  Henry From (1974–75)
  Jørn Bjerregaard (1976)
  Erik Christensen (1977–79)
  Poul Erik Bech (1980–83)
  Jürgen Wähling (1984–86)
  Jens Harmsen (1986)
  Allan Hebo Larsen (1987–88)
  Jens Harmsen (1989)
  Ole Brandenborg (1990)
  Lars Lundkvist (1990–93)
  Peter Rudbæk (1993–00)
  Lars Lundkvist &  Kent Nielsen (2000)
  Ove Christensen (2000–01)
  John Stampe (2001–02)
  Hans Petersen (2002)
  Poul Hansen (2002–03)
  Sören Åkeby (1 January 2004 – 31 December 2005)
  Brian Steen Nielsen &  Jesper Tollefsen (2005)
  Ove Pedersen (1 January 2006 – 31 December 2008)
  Erik Rasmussen (1 January 2009 – 20 May 2010)
  Peter Sørensen (1 July 2010 – 26 February 2014)
  Jesper Fredberg (27 February 2014 – 30 May 2014)
  Morten Wieghorst (30 May 2014 – 5 December 2015)
  Glen Riddersholm (6 December 2015 – 30 September 2017)
  David Nielsen (2 October 2017 – 21 May 2022)
  Uwe Rösler (14 June 2022 - Present)

Seasons

Records 
Since 1927, AGF has played 68 seasons at the highest level in Danish football, which is a record.

Other records

 Biggest victory: 13–1 against Fremad Amager, 28. October 1934
 Biggest defeat: 0–9 against B 93, 7. April 1946, 0–9 against B 1913 20. October 1940 and 0–9 against KB, 15. September 1968.
 Most undefeated games in a row: 26 (4. November 1985 – 9. November 1986)
 Most undefeated home games in a row: 26 (19. March 1995 – 16. August 1996)
 Most home victories in a row: 15 (7. September 1952 – 10. May 1953)
 Most games in a row without a victory: 16 (9. June 1968 – 7. April 1969)
 Most lost games in a row: 11 (22. August 1968 – 3. November 1968)
 Attendance record: 23.990. AGF – Esbjerg fB 0–4, (23. October 1962)
 Most matches: John Stampe 444 matches (1977–1991)
 Most seasons: Aage Rou Jensen 19 seasons (1943–1961)
 Most titles: John Amdisen, 4 Danish Football Championships and 5 Danish Cups (1955–1965)
 Youngest player: Navid Dayyani, 16 years 244 days, (19. October 2003)
 Oldest player: Erik Boye, 39 years 59 days, (6. April 2003)

AGF in European Competition

AGF's first competitive European match was on September 21, 1955, in the 1955–56 European Cup, losing 0–2 at home to France's Stade Reims & eventually losing on aggregate 2–4 in the first round. Since then, the club has participated in numerous UEFA competitions, advancing as far as the quarter-finals of the 1960–61 European Cup and 1988–89 UEFA Cup Winners' Cup.

References

External links 

 Official website in English
 Official website for the football department

 
Football clubs in Denmark
Athletics clubs in Denmark
Association football clubs established in 1902
Sports clubs established in 1880
Multi-sport clubs in Denmark
1880 establishments in Denmark
Sport in Aarhus